Derek Boote (13 December 1942 - 29 November 1974) was a Welsh singer and actor.

Boote came from Star, near Gaerwen on Anglesey. He was educated in Llangefni and at the Royal Welsh College of Music and Drama in Cardiff.

Boote played the guitar and double bass and sang with the Welsh broadcaster Hywel Gwynfryn; they later formed a group with singer Endaf Emlyn. Boote competed in the 1971 edition of Welsh singing competition Cân i Gymru.

Boote performed alongside Ryan and Ronnie, playing the original Nigel Wyn character on their sketch show. After his death, he was replaced by Bryn Williams. He also appeared in the Welsh-language television programme Dau a Hanner (Two and a Half).

Boote released an EP record Byw'n Rhydd on the Recordiau'r Dryw label.

Boote died in 1974 in Chepstow, following a freak accident. While filming a children's programme, his costume caught fire after he dropped cigarette ash on it, and he was seriously burned.

References

1942 births
1974 deaths
Deaths from fire
Welsh-speaking actors
Welsh folk singers
British folk guitarists
British double-bassists